Matteo Pratichetti (born 27 July 1985 in Rome) is a former Italian rugby union player.

Pratichetti's father, Oreste, was a rugby player and coach, his uncle Carlo was capped several times for Italy in the 1980s, and his brother Andrea was his teammate at Calvisano for the 2008–09 season.

Since his adolescence, Pratichetti played in the UR Capitolina's (one of the several Roman rugby union teams) youth squad; in 2004, at 19, he moved to Calvisano in the Super 10 and won the Italian Championship at the end of his debut season with his new club.

His first cap for Italy was in November 2004 against the All Blacks; his 2nd cap was more than 2 years later in the 2007 Six Nations Championship, with Pierre Berbizier as Italy's head coach.
Berbizier included Pratichetti in the Italy squad for the 2007 Rugby World Cup.

Also the new head coach Nick Mallett included Pratichetti in the squad for the 2008 Summer tour of South Africa and Argentina.

Pratichetti won one more Super 10 with Calvisano in 2008. In June 2010 he joined Aironi.

Honours 
 Super 10: Calvisano 2004–05; 2007–08
 Italy national rugby union team: 24 caps, 5 tries

References

External links
RBS 6 Nations profile
ERC bio

1985 births
Italian rugby union players
Living people
Rugby union centres
Sportspeople from Rome
Italy international rugby union players
Rugby Calvisano players
Rugby Viadana players
Aironi players
Zebre Parma players